For the proposed skyscraper in Paris, see Le Phare (skyscraper).

Le Phare is the third studio album by French composer Yann Tiersen.  This was the artist's breakthrough album.  He collaborated with distinguished French songwriter Dominique A (who wrote and provided vocals to both "Monochrome" and "Les Bras de mer").  It is typical of Tiersen's work for violin, mandolin, accordion and piano to feature heavily. Also a trademark feature of his style is unusual instrumentation, including a bicycle wheel, typewriters and saucepans.  Three songs from this album, "La Dispute", "La Noyée", and "Sur le fil" were used later for Tiersen's soundtrack for the film Le Fabuleux Destin d'Amélie Poulain.  "L'Homme aux bras ballants" is also the soundtrack to a short film by the same name by Laurent Gorgiard.  "Sur le fil" has become a live favourite, normally only the violin section performed with great intensity, sometimes even breaking many hairs on the bow.

Reception

Track listing

Personnel
This also contains all the instruments used on the album.

Musicians
 Yann Tiersen - violins, accordion, piano, mandolins, guitar, typewriter, small and big saucepans, cooking pot, tam-tam, banjo, harpsichord, oud, acoustic guitar, 12 stringed guitar, toy piano, vibraphone, cello, melodica, chimes, bowed mandolins, bicycles, bontempi, vocals 
 Claire Pichet - vocals on "La Rupture"
 Dominique A - vocals on "Monochrome", vocals, piano, and guitar on "Les Bras de mer"
 Sacha Toorop - percussion, drum kit, big drum, and small bell on "Le Quartier", "La Rupture", "Monochrome", and "Les Bras de mer"

Production
 Stephane Kraemer - engineer, mixing
 Frank Loriou - artwork
 Renaud Monfourny - photography

Charts

Certifications and sales

According to Music for New Zealand the album has sold over 160,000 copies.

Notes

1998 albums
Yann Tiersen albums